Protea namaquana, also known as the Kamiesberg sugarbush, is a flowering plant which belongs to the genus Protea. The plant is endemic to the southwestern Cape Region of South Africa, in particular the Kamiesberg mountains of Namaqualand in the Northern Cape province. The species has a worldwide distribution of only 18 km2. It is regarded as critically endangered. In the Afrikaans language it has the vernacular name is Kamiesbergsuikerbos.

Gallery

See also 
 List of Southern African indigenous trees and woody lianes
 List of Protea species

References 

 http://pza.sanbi.org/protea-namaquana

namaquana
Trees of Africa
Taxa named by John Patrick Rourke
Plants described in 1990